Ranipur is a town in northern Sindh province of Pakistan, located in approximately 50 kilometers from the city of Khairpur, and approximately 30 kilometers from the ancient Kot Diji fort. Ranipur is notable for being home of the famous Sachal Sarmast shrine, which displays fine examples of a traditional Sindhi tilework.

History
It was established before the Kalhora reign of Sindh (1701 to 1783 AD). A unique City between two canals Rohri Canal on the East and Abul Canal on the West. Rani means QUEEN it is said that the Name of the city is based on one of Princess of Darya Khan who rules Thatta. It become the famous first time in British occupation when an anti-Khilafat’ movement was operated from Ranipur City by the Pir's of the City to protect the interest of the British Raj occupation in Sindh. Ranipur is the main Town And Union Council of the Khairpur District of Sindh province, Pakistan. [1]

Education
Government Primary Boys School Ranipur was established in 1892 AD. Government High School Ranipur was founded in 1939. Government Girls Primary School, Sachal Sarmast Degree College, and Government Girls Degree College Ranipur are Prime Institute of City. Private sector, Ahlul Bait Public School, Mehran Public Higher Secondary School, Yasir Public High School, Ever Shine College, Mazhar Muslim Model School College, Bahria Foundation College. Sachal public school, Eman public school,
City has Religious Educational Named  Dar-ul-Fauoz madarsa(دارالفيوض ) Soomra Muhalla, Jamia Masjid Memon Muhalla, where students getting Education in Arabic as well as in Persian.

Culture
Shrines.  6 shrines make it popular in the country. These are shrine of Saleh Shah and Hajran shah famous as Bodelo Bahar. Nowadays this city is famous for its numerous Gates, 1. Babe Dastageer, 2. Babe Sachal Sarmast, 3. Babe Bodela, 4. Babe Saleh Sha, 5. Babe Abdul Jabbar Shah. 6. Shatan Shah Badshah

Transportation
Ranipur is located at kilometer marker 419 on the main N-5 National Highway.
3 kilometer at daraza sharif where the tomb of Hazrat Sachal Sarmast is located a famous Sufi poet of Sindh. Ranipur is the heart of khairpur. The city has a busy road Mitho Muhammad Haroon road that leads to residential areas such as Memon mohalla, Ansari, Umrani Muhallah Station road, Shaikh muhalla Farooq e Azam chowk this road has the name of the very kind personality and social activist and philanthropist Mitho Muhammad Haroon he was such a kind man he fights for the rights of people it was his efforts to restore the railway station of ranipur's train timings as they weren't stopping there Ex Shah rukh na Alamdistrict and center of education of district. There are very famous institutes of sindh in ranipur like Ever Shine College Raipur( Founded By Sir Engineer Mr. Mumtaz Ali Channa)Mazahar Muslim Model Higher Secondary School Ranipur(was founded by Sir Qurban Ali Memon), Mehran Public School Ranipur, Quaid Care Public School and, Bahria college Ranipur, Sachal public school, Eman public school, where students come from every corner of Sindh.

References

 Populated places in Khairpur District